Husum station is a station on the Frederikssund radial of the S-train network in Copenhagen, Denmark. It serves the area around the former village Husum, and is also the S-train station that is easiest to reach by bus from Mørkhøj in Gladsaxe and parts of northern Rødovre municipality.

History
The station opened in 1880, shortly after the railway to Frederikssund opened. S-train service began on 15 May 1949.

See also
Husum station in Germany
Husum station in Sweden

See also
 List of railway stations in Denmark

References

External links

S-train (Copenhagen) stations
Railway stations opened in 1880
Railway stations in Denmark opened in the 19th century